The Blue Line is one of the four lines of the Montreal Metro in Montreal, Quebec, Canada. It was the fourth to be built, notwithstanding its alternate official name of "Line 5" (Line 3 was planned, but never built). Unlike the other three routes, the east–west Blue Line does not serve the city's main Metro junction at Berri-UQAM. 

The line first opened in 1986, with the last addition to the line being an intermediate station in 1988. The line is currently being extended five stations to the east, with completion due in 2029.

History 
Construction of Snowdon station began in 1975, with two platform levels. In 1979, the provincial government confirmed plans to build the Blue Line, an east–west line that runs through the centre of the island of Montreal. 

On 16 June 1986, the first section opened, between Saint-Michel to De Castelnau. That was followed by the section from De Castelnau to Parc on 15 June 1987 and Parc to Snowdon on 4 January 1988. The opening of the intermediate station Acadie was delayed for almost three months and occurred on 28 March 1988. 

Due to low usage, the line was initially operated from 5:30 am to 7:30 pm on weekdays, and used three-car trains instead of the nine-car trains used on the other Metro lines. Students from the University of Montreal, the main source of Blue Line riders, obtained an extension of the closing time to 11:10 pm and then 12:15 am in 2002.

In the 2020s, a renovation of Édouard-Montpetit station began to link the station to the new Réseau express métropolitain, which will replace the Deux-Montagnes line with rapid transit.

In January 2023, the Société de transport de Montréal announced that the line would be re-signalled with communications-based train control as part of the work to extend the line eastwards to Anjou. This work was scheduled to be completed by 2029, at a cost of $565 million.

Extensions
Initials proposals for the line in the 1970s suggested that the line would run from Ville Saint-Pierre, Lachine in the west, passing through the centre of the island of Montreal, before turning north towards Montréal-Nord.

Eastern extension to Anjou 
Following the opening of the line in the 1980s, various governments have proposed extending the line east to Anjou, such as prior to the provincial elections of 1989. Various studies took place to understand the cost and ridership potential of an extension.

The former Agence métropolitaine de transport (AMT, now ARTM) published a study, Vision 2020, in December 2011. The study proposed extending the Blue Line northeast of Saint-Michel to Anjou. There were a total of five planned new stations: Pie-IX, Viau, Lacordaire, Langelier and Anjou. The terminus would be located at the Galeries d'Anjou shopping centre, near the junction of Autoroute 25 and Autoroute 40.

On 20 September 2013, a  extension northeast to St. Leonard and Anjou was announced by the STM and the Quebec government. The provincial government announced that the extension would proceed and committed $38.8 million to set up a project office tasked with preparing detailed financial and technical plans within two years. The start of construction was slated for 2021, with completion in 2025. On 28 May 2014, it was announced that the project would be reviewed by the new provincial government and that, if the project was again approved, construction would start in 2021, which was confirmed in the STM's new 2025 Plan. 

On 9 April 2018, premier of Quebec Philippe Couillard and Prime Minister Justin Trudeau announced their commitment to fund and complete the extension, then planned to open in 2026. Around $365 million was provided to STM to allow them to purchase land and undertake design and technical work.  

In March 2022, it was announced that the federal government had agreed to provide $1.3 billlion to the extension, with further costs to be covered by the provincial government. The  extension was set to include five new stations, two bus terminals, a pedestrian tunnel connecting to the Pie-IX BRT and a new park-and-ride. Overall, the project was estimated to cost around $5.8 to $6.4 billion and scheduled to be completed in 2029. 

Initial construction work began in August 2022. Procurement work to build the tunnels and stations began in the fourth quarter of 2022, and major construction will follow after contractors are appointed.

Proposed western extension 
Another proposed expansion involves extending the Blue Line southwest from Snowdon, which would serve Notre-Dame-de-Grâce, Côte-Saint-Luc, and Montreal West. That Metro extension has been put on hold indefinitely.

Rolling stock

Since 1986, Blue Line trains are made up of MR-73 cars. Each train consists of two segments of three cars, shorter than the Green, Orange, and Yellow Line trains, which all comprise three segments of three cars, for a total of nine cars. Some nine-car MR-73 trains were transferred from the Orange to the Blue Line, but these had to be shortened to six-car configurations.

The line is served by Youville Shops, located between Parc and de Castelnau stations. This is located  underground and occupies a small portion underneath Jarry Park. Another service facility is located at the 500-metre end tracks following Snowdon station, but is rarely used by the STM

List of stations

See also 
 Green Line
 Orange Line
 Yellow Line
 Red Line (Line 3)
 List of Montreal Metro stations

References

External links 
 2008 STM System Map

 
Rapid transit lines in Canada